

384001–384100 

|-bgcolor=#f2f2f2
| colspan=4 align=center | 
|}

384101–384200 

|-bgcolor=#f2f2f2
| colspan=4 align=center | 
|}

384201–384300 

|-id=282
| 384282 Evgeniyegorov ||  || Evgeniy Mikhaylovich Egorov (born 1945) is an expert designer. He has created more than 1500 symbols and logos, including coats of arms and product branding. He is an honorary academician of the Russian Academy of Arts and a member of "the World club of Petersburgers". || 
|}

384301–384400 

|-bgcolor=#f2f2f2
| colspan=4 align=center | 
|}

384401–384500 

|-bgcolor=#f2f2f2
| colspan=4 align=center | 
|}

384501–384600 

|-id=533
| 384533 Tenerelli ||  || Domenick Tenerelli (born 1935), an American engineer || 
|-id=582
| 384582 Juliasmith ||  || Julia Smith (born 1984), an American expert in federal relations at the University of Arizona and former Assistant Vice President at the Association of American Universities (Src). || 
|}

384601–384700 

|-bgcolor=#f2f2f2
| colspan=4 align=center | 
|}

384701–384800 

|-bgcolor=#f2f2f2
| colspan=4 align=center | 
|}

384801–384900 

|-id=815
| 384815 Żołnowski ||  || Michał Żołnowski (born 1975), a Polish amateur astronomer, astrophotographer and discoverer of minor planets || 
|}

384901–385000 

|-bgcolor=#f2f2f2
| colspan=4 align=center | 
|}

References 

384001-385000